This is a list of Austrian composers, singers, conductors and bands:



A
Johann Georg Albrechtsberger (1736-1809), composer and music theorist
August Wilhelm Ambros (1816-1876), composer (19th century)
Wolfgang Ambros, singer (Austropop)

B
Paul Badura-Skoda, pianist (1927-2019)
Caroline Bayer (1758–1803), violinist and composer
Johanna Beisteiner, classical guitarist (born 1976)
Alban Berg, composer, (1885–1935), born in Vienna
Walter Berry, bass-baritone, (1929–2000)
Bilderbuch, band founded in 2005
Karl Böhm, conductor, (1894–1981)
Norbert Brainin (1923-2005), violinist
Alfred Brendel, pianist, (born 1931)
Anton Bruckner, composer, (1824–1896)

C
Amalia Carneri (1875–1943), Polish-born soprano opera singer
Friedrich Cerha (1926–2023), composer and conductor
Carl Czerny (1791-1857), pianist and composer

D
Johann Nepomuk David, composer, (1895–1977)
Anton Diabelli (1781-1858), publisher, editor and composer
Wolfgang Dimetrik (born 1974), classical accordionist
Carl Ditters von Dittersdorf, composer, (1739–1799)
Nico Dostal (1895-1981), composer

E
Gottfried von Einem (1918-1996), composer 20th century
Karlheinz Essl, composer and electronic musician, (born 1960)

F
Falco, (1957–1998), pop musician
Rainhard Fendrich (born 1955), singer 
Christian Fennesz (born 1962), electronic musician
Rudolf Fitzner (1868-1934), violinist and music teacher
Gerhard Friedle (born 1971) better known by the stage name DJ Ötzi, dance pop musician and DJ
Camilla Frydan (1887–1949), pianist, soubrette singer, composer and songwriter
Robert Fuchs (1847-1927), composer and music scientist
Johann Fux, composer (c. 1660–1741)

G
Bernhard Gál (born 1971), composer and artist
Ernest Gold (1921-1999), composer 20th century (winner of the Academy Award)
Franz Gruber (1787-1863), composer ("Silent Night, Holy Night")
Gerhard Gruber (born 1951), pianist and composer
Heinz Karl Gruber, composer, (born 1943) 
Friedrich Gulda (1930-2000), pianist and composer, born in 1930 in Vienna, died in 2000 in Steinbach am Attersee

H
Georg Friedrich Haas (born 1953), composer of contemporary classical music 
Nikolaus Harnoncourt (1929-2016), famous contemporary conductor, mainly of early music
Josef Matthias Hauer (1883-1959), composer and music theorist
Joseph Haydn (1732-1809), author of "Imperial Hymn" now German Anthem
Michael Haydn (1737-1806), composer (younger brother of Joseph Haydn)
Hansi Hinterseer (born 1954), singer, actor, entertainer and former alpine skier.
Franz Anton Hoffmeister, composer, (1754–1812)
Roman Hofstetter (1742-1815), composer
Wolfgang Holzmair (born 1952), baritone

J
Hanns Jelinek (1901-1969), composer (also known as Hanns Elin)
Udo Jürgens (1934-2014), singer-songwriter
Walter Jurmann (1903-1971), composer

K
Franz Kalchmair, opera singer (born 1939)
Herbert von Karajan, conductor, (1908–1989)
King Electric, pop duo
Carlos Kleiber, conductor, son of Erich Kleiber, (1930–2004)
Erich Kleiber, conductor, (1890–1956)
Erich Wolfgang Korngold (1897-1957), composer (born in Brno, Austria-Hungary)
Fritz Kreisler (1875-1962), violinist and composer
Ernst Krenek, composer (1900–1991)
Kruder & Dorfmeister, DJ and producer duo

L
Bill Leeb (born 1966), of Front Line Assembly. Born in Vienna, but currently lives in Vancouver, Canada
György Ligeti, composer (born in Hungary, citizen of Austria), (1923–2006)
Lukas Ligeti, composer (born 1965)
Franz Liszt (1811-1886), composer (born in Raiding, then Hungary, now Austria)

M
Gustav Mahler, composer, conductor 1860–1911
 Marianna Martines, composer, singer, 1744-1812
Johann Kaspar Mertz, guitarist and composer, 1806–1856
Felix Mottl, conductor and composer, 1856–1911
Wolfgang Amadeus Mozart, composer & musician, 1756–1791 (born in Salzburg)

O
Opus, rock band founded in 1973 (Live is Life)

P
Pomassl, electronic musician & sonic artist

R
Emil von Reznicek, composer (died 1945)
Marcel Rubin, composer (1905–1995)

S
Franz Schmidt, composer, 1874–1939
Arnold Schoenberg, composer, 1874–1951
Franz Schubert, composer & musician, 1797–1828
Max Steiner, composer (born in Vienna), 1888–1971
Johann Strauss, Sr., composer 1809–1849 
Johann Strauss, Jr., composer 1825–1899
Josef Strauss, composer 1827–1870
Heinz Strobl, composer and artist, goes by the name of Gandalf
Hedi Stadlen, musicologist, 1916–2004
Franz von Suppé, composer (born in Split, Austrian Empire), 1819-1895
Hermann Szobel, jazz fusion composer, born 1958

T
 von Trapp, family of famous folk music vocalists and Anschluss refugees in 1938 and the main subjects of two 1950's German films named for them, The Trapp Family (1956) and its sequel The Trapp Family in America (1958) the first of which premiered in the U.S. in 1961, and of 1965's The Sound of Music.

V
Johann Michael Vogl, baritone

W
Josef Wagner, composer (known for military marches)
Wanda, band founded in 2012
Stefan Weber, Drahdiwaberl
Anton Webern, composer, 1883–1945
Felix Weingartner, conductor, composer, pianist
Egon Joseph Wellesz, composer (pupil of Arnold Schönberg)
Franz Welser-Möst, conductor (born 1960)
Hugo Wolf, composer (Slovenian origin)
Peter Wolf, producer
Conchita Wurst, singer, winner of the Eurovision song contest 2014

Z
Joe Zawinul, jazz musician, composer, born in Vienna, 1932
 Erich Zeisl, modernist composer (1905–1959)
Alexander von Zemlinsky, composer and conductor 1871–1942

See also
List of Austrians
Austrian music

 
Music
 
Lists of musicians by nationality